Young Sherlock: The Mystery of the Manor House is an 8-episode television series about the youthful years of Sherlock Holmes.  The show was produced by Granada Television and premiered on 31 October 1982. Although there was no televised sequel to this story, Gerald Frow penned a follow-up for Granada's Dragon Books (who in 1982 published his novelisation of this tale). Young Sherlock: The Adventure at Ferryman's Creek went on sale in 1984.

Cast
Guy Henry as Sherlock Holmes
June Barry as Mrs. Turnbull
Tim Brierley as John Whitney
Donald Douglas as Colonel Turnbull
Heather Chasen as Aunt Rachel
John Fraser as Uncle Gideon
Christopher Villiers as Jasper Moran
Lewis Fiander as Ranjeet
Eva Griffith as Charity

Episodes

References

External links
 

1980s British children's television series
1980s British drama television series
1980s British mystery television series
1982 British television series debuts
1982 British television series endings
English-language television shows
ITV children's television shows
Sherlock Holmes pastiches
Sherlock Holmes television series
Television series set in the 1870s
Television shows produced by Granada Television